Independence Day of Ukraine is the main state holiday in modern Ukraine, celebrated on 24 August in commemoration of the Declaration of Independence of 1991.

History
When Ukraine was still a Soviet republic, the Ukrainian diaspora traditionally recognized 22 January (the Declaration of Independence of the Ukrainian People's Republic in 1918) as Ukrainian Independence day.

The current form of the holiday was first celebrated on 16 July 1991, as the first anniversary of the Declaration of State Sovereignty of Ukraine passed by the Verkhovna Rada (Ukraine's parliament) in 1990. Since the Declaration of Independence was issued on 24 August 1991, and confirmed by the referendum of 1 December 1991, the date of the holiday was changed.

Traditions

National Flag Day
Beginning in 2004, 23 August is celebrated as National Flag Day.

Parade
Generally (but not every year) independence day is celebrated with a military parade held in Kyiv, the capital of Ukraine. Since 2019 no military parade has taken place. According to a 21 October 2020 decree by President Volodymyr Zelenskyy in 2021 a military parade will be held (again) on the occasion of the 30th anniversary of Ukraine's Independence.

Recent and historical celebrations

1997
The Chayka Aviation Parade was a large-scale aviation show dedicated to Independence Day that took place at Kyiv Chaika Airfield in 1997. It featured flypasts by personnel of the Ukrainian Air Force. The parade was attended by President of Ukraine Leonid Kuchma and Minister of Defense Oleksandr Kuzmuk.

2016
After the annual military parade in Kyiv the "March of the Unconquered" was held by active members of Ukraine's volunteer battalions, relatives of those killed during the fighting in the Russo-Ukrainian War and family members of those killed during the Euromaidan uprising – known in Ukraine as the "Heavenly Hundred". According to the Ukrainian army the volume of artillery fire set off by the separatist forces of the war in Donbas during the 24-hour period of 24 August 2016 was the highest since the February 2015 Battle of Debaltseve.

Several Ukrainian cities held marches of people dressed in vyshyvanky (shirts with traditional Ukrainian embroidery).

2019

On 10 July 2019, President Volodymyr Zelenskyy announced on Facebook that the 2019 Ukrainian Independence Day celebrations will not include a military parade (for the first time since the parade's cancellation from 2010 to 2014) stating the following: "We have decided to allocate 300 mln hryvnias [nearly $12 mln] as bonus payments to our servicemen, i.e. fixed-term soldiers, cadets, sergeants, officers.” Zelenskyy also mentioned that the government would take steps to "honor heroes" on Independence Day by highlighting the fact that the "format will be new". On 30 July, Zelenskyy's Head of the Presidential Administration Andriy Bohdan announced that a March of Dignity (Марш гідності) will take place in replacement of the annual parade. A separate march, known as the March of Defenders (Марш захисників) was also planned to be held by Ukrainian war veterans. The ceremony went on as planned and even incorporated elements of the annual parade such as the flag raising ceremony and the awarding of veterans. During his speech, Zelenskyy called for unity, saying "Ukrainian-speaking and Russian-speaking, regardless of age, gender, religion – we must be one people".

2020

On Independence Day in 2020, President Zelenskyy during his speech proclaimed that there would never be military equipment on parade in Kyiv as long as the war in Donbas is ongoing, during which he said that it is "Where it is needed now." Zelensky stated that military parades would be held in the future "a parade of Ukrainian victory, when we will return all our people and all our territories." The ceremony, as well as the concert that followed, was held in Mykhailivska Square in front of St. Michael's Golden-Domed Monastery, the current seat of the Orthodox Church of Ukraine, and thus also honored the Ukrainian medical workers and professionals who had contributed their efforts during the current COVID-19 pandemic in all of Ukraine.

The joint concert of Ukrainian stars following the ceremony was marked by scandal because various artists performing in it had continued to perform and/or accept awards in Russia, despite the Ukrainian Autonomous Republic of Crimea being annexed by Russia in 2014 and the alleged support of Russia for the separatist forces of the war in Donbas. It was also condemned that this concert took place during the March of Defenders (Марш захисників) commemorating the victims of the war in Donbas.

In an English language Independence Day address, Zelenskyy launched an information campaign to restart the Ukraine NOW brand. The 2020 events served as a national kick-off to the celebrations in 2021 marking the pearl jubilee year of independence.

2021
In 2021, Ukraine celebrated the 30th anniversary of its independence with three days of events. A company from Lviv developed a special 30th Anniversary logo and a new award known as the "National Legend" was announced, to be presented in a ceremony on August 22. It was also announced that the first Summit of the Crimean Platform would take place on August 23. A number of foreign leaders were invited to the 30th anniversary celebrations, including US president Joe Biden, Greek president Katerina Sakellaropoulou, Lithuanian president Gitanas Nausėda and Moldovan president Maia Sandu.

On 24 August a large military parade made its way through Kyiv past Maidan Nezalezhnosti, featuring Ukrainian Ground Forces, Special Operations Forces, and visiting units from several foreign armed forces. The parade included more than 5000 troops and 400 tanks and armoured vehicles. The event also included a fly-by of Ukrainian Air Force units over Kyiv. Simultaneously, Ukrainian Navy units were shown carrying out exercises at Odessa. Visiting troops from Slovenia, Moldova, Poland, the United States of America and Canada marched with Ukrainian forces, and two British Royal Air Force Eurofighter Typhoons took part in the fly-by alongside four F-16 Fighting Falcons.

Delegates from 46 countries attended, including Polish President Andrzej Duda, Lithuanian President Gitanas Nauseda and French Foreign Minister Jean-Yves Le Drian, and Eastern Orthodox Church patriarch Bartholomew I of Constantinople.

Immediately prior to the parade, President Zelenskyy addressed the crowd, calling for closer relationships with other ex-Soviet countries, European nations, and NATO.

2022

Independence Day in 2022 marked the sixth month since the invasion of Ukraine by Russia began. Celebration of the holiday was restricted within war-torn Ukraine under martial law, but large scale celebration of Ukraine's Independence was held internationally in support of the country.

In Ukraine 
Ukraine's Culture Ministry confirmed there would not be any public celebration to mark the holiday. Officials warned civilians against gathering in major cities, with President Zelenskyy stating "Russia may try to do something particularly nasty, something particularly cruel." Russia would attack on the day of anniversary, shelling a civilian train in Chaplyne, Dnipropetrovsk Oblast, killing 25. The Russian defense ministry claimed it had targeted a military train using a single Iskander missile, and that the attack had successfully killed 200 Ukrainian soldiers.

In Kyiv, the Kyiv Independence Day Parade was cancelled for its tenth time as resources were directed to the war effort. Kyiv City Hall stated online "This year Ukraine celebrates the anniversary of independence in terms of martial law and under the threat of possible shelling. Mass events are prohibited, because the enemy is unpredictable, so we have to be prepared for any scenario.” In place of a parade, numerous Russian military vehicles and artilleries destroyed by Ukrainian troops were displayed along Khreshchatyk, where Zelenskyy issued a speech commemorating the anniversary and advocating for Ukrainian victory. Several civilians further defaced the remains with graffiti condemning Russia (namely Vladimir Putin) and calling for justice for devastated cities such as the Russian-occupied Mariupol. A drone carrying a large Flag of Ukraine was also flown around the Motherland Monument.

International 
From , President Alexander Lukashenko (an ardent supporter of Russia) acknowledged Ukraine's independence, stating "[he] wishes Ukrainians peaceful skies, tolerance, courage, strength and success in restoring a decent life." President Zelenskyy's top advisor Mykhailo Podolyak rejected the congratulatory message, calling it cynical and disingenuous given Belarus' heavy involvement in the attacks of Ukraine, and that "this blood-soaked clowning is recorded and will have consequences."

In , supporters and refugees of Ukraine gathered in the capital of Brussels, host to around 30% of the country's estimated 78,000 Ukrainian refugees. At the Grand-Place, the Manneken Pis was dressed in "traditional Kozak costume" and a large Flag of Ukraine was unfurled. European Commission President Ursula von der Leyen attended wearing Ukrainian colors.

In addition to support of Ukraine and its Azov Regiment, the demonstration saw extensive anti-Russian sentiment, with signings being made for a petition calling on the parliament of the Czech Republic to declare Russia a terrorist state. Similar demonstrations were also held in Brno's Moravian and Jakubske Squares.

In , a parade was held in Athens. The Hellenic Ministry of Foreign Affairs issued a statement to reaffirm Greece's solidarity with Ukraine, whose sovereignty and independence is recognized.

In , a parade was held in Berlin, where a candlelight vigil was set up in front of the Brandenburg Gate. Chancellor Olaf Scholz assured support, stating that Germany "stands firmly by the side of the threatened Ukraine today and for as long as Ukraine needs our support," and rebuked the Kremlin for its "backward imperialism."

In , a protest of 3,000 people against Putin and Russian violence was held in Dublin, marching 5 km from the General Post Office to the Ukrainian embassy. Ukrainian ambassador to Ireland  was in attendance. Other events were held across the country.

In , Rome's Ukrainian community participated in a "march for freedom" through the city center that passed the Colosseum. Prime Minister Mario Draghi gave congratulations and continued offers of support to Ukraine.

In , demonstrations were held in Valletta and Floriana. Prime Minister Robert Abela tweeted that "[Malta's] will to stay united and restore peace in Ukraine remains strong."

In , thousands of Polish citizens and Ukrainian refugees gathered in the city centers of Warsaw and Kraków in celebration and support. The Palace of Culture and Science was illuminated in Ukrainian blue and yellow. Warsaw's mayor Rafał Trzaskowski assured that "Poland is with [Ukraine], Warsaw is with [Ukraine]!" President Andrzej Duda also gave his support to Ukraine, recalling Poland as the first country in the world to have recognized Ukraine's independence.

In , a ceremony was held in Lisbon celebrating Ukraine's Independence Day, set around the city's statue of Taras Shevchenko. Portuguese Minister of Foreign Affairs João Gomes Cravinho visited the Ukrainian Minister of Foreign Affairs Dmytro Kuleba in Kyiv to further show Portugal's support.

In , a demonstration in Istanbul was held with performance of the State Anthem of Ukraine. Foreign Minister Mevlut Cavusoglu congratulated the country over Twitter on its independence from the Soviet Union. Turkish National Defense Minister Hulusi Akar promised Türkiye's continued support to Ukrainian Defence Minister Oleksii Reznikov and Infrastructure Minister Oleksandr Kubrakov.

In , a dedicated service was held at the York Minster in York. In London, a demonstration against the Russian invasion was held outside Downing Street. Chief Mouser to the Cabinet Office Larry was pictured in front of 10 Downing Street decorated with blue and yellow flowers (including sunflowers, one of Ukraine's floral emblems). In , hundreds in Edinburgh took part in a march on Calton Hill from the Volodomyr Velacky monument to the Holodomor plaque. Ukrainian Ambassador to the United Kingdom, Vadym Prystaiko, and his wife, Inna Prystaiko, were among the participants. According to the British Embassy Kyiv, Queen Elizabeth II congratulated Ukrainians, stating "I hope that today will be a time for the Ukrainian people, both in Ukraine and around the world, to celebrate their culture, history, and identity." Prime Minister Boris Johnson also expressed that "[Ukraine] will win" and has the United Kingdom's support. The Ministry of Defence tweeted a video of the Band of the Scots Guards performing "Stefania".

President Joe Biden called the 31st anniversary's coincidence with the half-year mark of the war "bittersweet", and pledged approximately $2.98 billion USD in military aid to Ukraine's forces. Congratulations were issued by other U.S. politicians including Secretary of State Antony Blinken, NYC Mayor Eric Adams, and Massachusetts Representative Paul Tucker. Preceding Independence Day, the U.S. Embassy in Ukraine issued warnings from the United States Department of State that Russia would most likely increase attacks on civilians and infrastructure.

Notes

References

External links

 
About Independence Day in Ukraine
 
 

August observances
Ukrainian culture
Ukraine
1992 establishments in Ukraine
Public holidays in Ukraine
Ukrainian independence movement
Summer events in Ukraine
Recurring events established in 1992